David Burns Hyer (May 21, 1875 – December 11, 1942) was an American architect who practiced in Charleston, South Carolina and Orlando, Florida during the first half of the twentieth century, designing civic buildings in the Neoclassical Revival and Mediterranean Revival styles.

Biography
David Burns Hyer was born on May 21, 1875, in Charleston, South Carolina, the youngest son of James S. Hyer and Ella Payne.  Hyer served as a civil engineer at the Charleston Navy Yard and for many Southern railways, before opening his own private architectural practice in Charleston.  Hyer’s Charleston office was located in the People's Building.

David Hyer married Sally Yeadon Mazyck, daughter of James Mazyck, in June 1904; they had four children: David B Hyer Jr., Yeadon Mazyck Hyer, Robert Payne Hyer and Helen Hyer
 
Active in Charleston (see partial list of works below) Hyer was a member of the South Carolina Chapter of the American Institute of Architects (AIA).  By the early 1920s the Hyers established a home in Orlando.  Hyer worked in association with Daytona and Winter Park architect John Arthur Rogers (father of architect James Gamble Rogers II); he also listed his architectural business in the Orlando city directories.  As such, it was one of only 10 architectural firms listed in 1926, the others including: Frank L. Bodine, Fred E. Field, Murry S. King, Maurice E. Kressly, George E. Krug, Howard M. Reynolds, Frederick H. Trimble. Ryan and Roberts (Ida Annah Ryan and Isabel Roberts) and Percy P. Turner. It was one of 12 firms so listed in Orlando in 1927.  During the 1920s Hyer maintained Orlando offices first in the Rose Building and later in the Phillips Block on South Orange Avenue.

Hyer's best and most visible Orlando work is the Grace Phillips Johnson Estate on Edgewater Drive.  The grand Mediterranean Revival home is on a narrow isthmus between Lake Adair and Lake Concord, with sweeping views across Lake Concord to downtown Orlando. The house once had three murals by Florida artist Sam Stoltz, only one remains, a peacock.

James Gamble Rogers II managed David B. Hyer's Orlando office in 1934; by 1935 Hyer had moved back to Charleston permanently. Hyer continued to practice architecture in South Carolina as late as 1941.  Hyer died on December 11, 1942, in Charleston, South Carolina.

Architectural Work – Partial Listing

57 and 59 Gibbes St., Charleston SC - 1915 
 Garden Theater, 371 King Street, Charleston, SC – C. K. Howell and D. B. Hyer - 1918
 Y.W.C.A., Charleston, SC - 1918
 Buist School, 103 Calhoun Street, Charleston, SC - 1920
 W.T. Grant & Co. building, 265-267 King St. - 1920
 Charleston High School, Charleston, SC - 1921
 St. Barnabas Lutheran Church, 45 Moultrie Street, Charleston, SC – 1922
 King Street Apartments, Charleston, SC (County Hall) - 1922
 First National Bank Building, Holly Hill, SC - 1922
 Trustees School, North Charleston, SC - 1922
 Andrew B. Murray Vocational School, 3 Chisolm Street, Charleston, SC - 1923
 Grace Protestant Episcopal Church, 98 Wentworth Street, Charleston, SC - 1923
 Charleston Heights Baptist Church - 1923
 Winyah Indigo School, Georgetown, SC - 1924
 Charleston Country Club, Charleston, SC - 1925 (as associate architect with Parsons & Co. of Boston, MA)
 Pounds Motor Company Building, 162 W. Plant St., Winter Garden, FL - 1925
 Grace Phillips Johnson Estate; 1005 Edgewater Drive, Orlando, FL - 1928
 A. E. Arthur One-Stop Service Station, Orlando, FL - 1929
 Old Station 9, 1099 King Street, Charleston, SC - 1933
 Charleston County Courthouse (original 1792 Statehouse) additions, 84 Broad Street, Charleston, SC - 1941
 Julian Mitchell School (now Mitchell Elementary)
 Rutledge Avenue Baptist Church, Charleston - 1917 
 Rutledge Avenue Baptist Church (addition)
 Ben Tillman School (now the Ronald McNair School)

Gallery

References

Further reading

See also
John Henry Devereux South Carolina architect who was a contemporary

1875 births
1942 deaths
Architects from South Carolina
People from Orlando, Florida
Architecture firms based in Florida